Alexandre Nunes  was born in Lisbon, Portugal on June 27, 1974.

With a musician father and an artist mother, he traveled to numerous European countries before the age of five. During his childhood, he showed an aptitude for drawing and was attracted to different types of artistic expression, such as painting, music, photography and filmmaking.

From 1996 to 2001, Nunes studied graphic design, worked as a cartoon colorist for a production house (Ciné-Groupe) and completed coursework in an intensive web development program at Maisonneuve College. After a few excursions to various creative territories, he is now exploring the sculpting medium. He is enrolled in a BFA program at Concordia University and works for ESPACE sculpture magazine.

Sculptural work
Inspired by the poetry and the beauty of decaying industrial structures, Alexandre Nunes creates hybrid installations that describes a combination of auto-biographical themes juxtaposed with dirty and old aesthetic objects. His practice is rooted in taking found objects and transforming them through physical and semantic changes to the point that they become ironic or poetic.

References
 http://alexandrenunes.ca
 https://archive.today/20130117042857/http://artfox.com/nunes
 https://web.archive.org/web/20120327172134/http://portfoliofinearts.ca/students/100-alexandre-nunes
 http://www.espace-sculpture.com
 Nunes, Alexandre. "Retourne-Moi / Invert Me Out: Emmanuel Galland et François Lalumière", ESPACE #94, Montreal, December 2010.
 Nunes, Alexandre. "Pluie: Guy Laramée, Entrevue", ESPACE #93, Montreal, September 2010.
 Nunes, Alexandre. "Playground: Nathalie Quagliotto, Entrevue", ESPACE #91, Montreal, March 2010.
  

    

1974 births
Living people
People from Lisbon
Portuguese artists